Alexander or Alex MacDonald may refer to:

Politics
 Alasdair Óg of Islay (died 1299), Lord of Islay and chief of Clann Domhnaill
 Alexander of Islay, Earl of Ross, or Alexander MacDonald (died 1449), Scottish nobleman
 Alexander MacDonald, 5th of Dunnyveg (died 1538), Scoto-Irish chieftain
 Alexander Og MacDonald (died 1613), chief of the MacDonalds of Dunnyveg
 Alexander Macdonald, 17th of Keppoch (died 1746), Scottish clan chief, military officer, and prominent Jacobite
 Alexander Macdonald, 1st Baron Macdonald (died 1795), Scottish peer
 Alexander Macdonald, 2nd Baron Macdonald (1773–1824), Scottish peer and Member of Parliament
 Alexander Francis Macdonald (1818–1913), politician and railway contractor
 Alexander Macdonald (Lib–Lab politician) (1821–1881), Scottish miner, teacher, trade union leader and Lib-Lab politician
 Alexander Macdonald (Manitoba politician) (1844–1928), Canadian politician, Mayor of Winnipeg in 1892
 Alexander Macdonald, 7th Baron Macdonald (1909–1970), grandson of 6th Baron Macdonald
 Alexander Macdonald (British Columbia politician) (1918–2014), Canadian MP for Vancouver Kingsway
 Alexander Macdonald (New York politician) (1867–1935), Canadian-American politician and conservationist
 Alex Macdonald (trade unionist) (1910–1969), Australian trade unionist

Other
 Alasdair mac Mhaighstir Alasdair (1698–1770), known in English as Alexander MacDonald, Scottish poet
 Alexander Macdonald (antiquary) (1791–1850), Scottish antiquarian and editor
 Alexander MacDonald (Scottish bishop) (1736–1791), Roman Catholic bishop and vicar apostolic in Scotland
 Alexander Macdonald (artist) (1849–1921), first Ruskin Master at the University of Oxford
 Alexander MacDonald (Canadian bishop) (1858–1941), Canadian Roman Catholic bishop, educator and author
 Alexander Macdonald (Presbyterian minister) (1885–1960), Scottish minister and Moderator of the General Assembly of the Church of Scotland
 Alex Bath MacDonald (1898–1981), Australian Army officer
 Alex MacDonald (footballer, born 1948), Scottish football player and manager
 Alex MacDonald (footballer, born 1990), Scottish football player
 Alex MacDonald (cricketer), English cricketer

See also
Alexander Og MacDonald (disambiguation)
Alexander McDonald (disambiguation)
Alex McDonald (disambiguation)